Alexander Fyodorovich Ilyin (November 28, 1894 – September 3, 1941), known with the party name Zhenevsky, "the Genevan" because he joined the Bolshevik group of Russian émigrés while exiled in that city, was a Soviet chess master and organizer, one of founders of the Soviet chess school, an Old-Guard Bolshevik cadre, a writer, a military organizer, a historian and a diplomat. He was born in Saint Petersburg and was the younger brother of Red Navy leader Fedor Raskolnikov.

Ilyin-Zhenevsky promoted chess as an educational vehicle for developing tactical and strategical comprehension during military training, and, within the Soviet Union, he was the main person responsible for the spreading of the idea of chess as a way to teach the basics of scientific and rational thought. The All-Russian Chess Olympiad (retroactively recognized as the first Soviet Championship) in 1920 and the 1933 match Mikhail Botvinnik – Salo Flohr were organized by him. He was three times chess champion of Leningrad, in 1925 (jointly), 1926, and 1929. In 1925, he won a game against José Raúl Capablanca, one of only a few players to have ever beaten Capablanca in a tournament game.

A variation of the Dutch Defence, characterized by the moves 1.d4 f5 2.c4 Nf6 3.g3 e6 4.Bg2 Be7 5.Nf3 0-0 6.0-0 d6 7.Nc3, is named after him.

Now for the black is possible to play three different moves peculiar for this system:

7...a5; 7...Qe8; 7...Ne4

Being personally associated with many oppositionists since Civil War times, he suffered persecution in the Joseph Stalin era. According to Botvinnik and official sources he died in a Nazi air raid on Lake Ladoga on a ship during the siege of Leningrad, but it is believed by some that he fell victim to the Great Purge. But this claim is very dubious, because in 1941, after the end of the purge, Ilyin-Genevsky was playing in the Rostov-on-Don Semifinal for the 13th Soviet Championship on the day Germany invaded the Soviet Union.

Ilyin died during the Second World War during the evacuation of Leningrad amidst a German air raid.

Political works 
 From February to the Conquest of Power
 The Bolsheviks in Power - Reminiscences of the Year 1918, New Park,

References

1894 births
1941 deaths
Diplomats from Saint Petersburg
Soviet chess players
Chess theoreticians
20th-century chess players
Victims of the Siege of Leningrad
Deaths by airstrike during World War II
Sportspeople from Saint Petersburg